This is a list of airports in West Bengal, a state in eastern India, grouped by type and sorted by location. It contains all public-use and military airports in the state.

This list contains the following information:
 City served - The city generally associated with the airport. This is not always the actual location since some airports are located in smaller towns outside the city they serve.
 ICAO - The location indicator assigned by the International Civil Aviation Organization (ICAO).
 IATA - The airport code assigned by the International Air Transport Association (IATA).
 Airport name - The official airport name. Those shown in bold indicate the airport has scheduled service on commercial airlines.
 Note - Specific information related to the airport

Airports

Gallery

See also 
 List of airports by ICAO code: V#VA VE VI VO - India
 List of airports in India
 List of airports in the Kolkata metropolitan area
 List of Indian Air Force bases
 Wikipedia:WikiProject Aviation/Airline destination lists: Asia#India

References 

 
 Airports Authority of India website: AirportsIndia.org.in or AAI.aero
 
  - includes IATA codes
 Great Circle Mapper - IATA and ICAO codes
 List of Indian Air Force Stations at GlobalSecurity.org
 -AAI NOTAM summary January 2013
  - Old airfields of Midnapore

 
Airports
West Bengal